Yodh (also spelled jodh, yod, or jod) is the tenth letter of the Semitic abjads, including Phoenician Yōd /𐤉, Hebrew Yōd , Aramaic Yod , Syriac Yōḏ ܝ, and Arabic  .

The Phoenician letter gave rise to the Greek Iota (Ι), Latin I and J,  Cyrillic І, Coptic  (Ⲓ) and Gothic eis .

The term yod is often used to refer to the speech sound , a palatal approximant, even in discussions of languages not written in Semitic abjads, as in phonological phenomena such as English "yod-dropping".

Origins

Yod originated from a hieroglyphic “hand”, or *yad.

Hebrew Yod 

Hebrew spelling:  ;Fileformat.info colloquial 

The letter appears with or without a hook on different sans-serif fonts, for example
 Arial, DejaVu Sans, Arimo, Open Sans: י
 Tahoma, Alef, Heebo: י

Pronunciation
In both Biblical and modern Hebrew, Yod represents a palatal approximant. As a mater lectionis, it represents the vowel .

Significance
In gematria, Yod represents the number ten.

As a prefix, it designates the third person singular (or plural, with a Vav as a suffix) in the future tense.

As a suffix, it indicates first person singular possessive; av (father) becomes avi (my father).

"Yod" in the Hebrew language signifies iodine. Iodine is also called يود yod in Arabic.

In religion
Two Yods in a row designate the name of God Adonai and in pointed texts are written with the vowels of Adonai; this is done as well with the Tetragrammaton.

As Yod is the smallest letter, much kabbalistic and mystical significance is attached to it. According to the Gospel of Matthew, Jesus mentioned it during the Antithesis of the Law, when he says: "One jot or one tittle shall in no wise pass from the law, till all be fulfilled." Jot, or iota, refers to the letter Yod; it was often overlooked by scribes because of its size and position as a mater lectionis. In modern Hebrew, the phrase "tip of the Yod" refers to a small and insignificant thing, and someone who "worries about the tip of a Yod" is someone who is picky and meticulous about small details.

Much kabbalistic and mystical significance is also attached to it because of its gematria value as ten, which is an important number in Judaism, and its place in the name of God.

Yiddish

In Yiddish, the letter yod is used for several orthographic purposes in native words:
 Alone, a single yod י may represent the vowel  or the consonant . Thus the word Yidish 'Yiddish' is spelled ייִדיש. The first yod represents []; the second yod represents [] and is distinguished from the adjacent [] by a dot; the third yod represents [] as well, but no dot is necessary.
 The digraph יי, consisting of two yods, represents the diphthong [].
 A pair of yods with a horizontal line (pasekh) under them, ײַ, represents the diphthong [] in standard Yiddish.
 The digraph consisting of a vov followed by a yod, וי, represents the diphthong [].

Loanwords from Hebrew or Aramaic in Yiddish are spelled as they are in their language of origin.

Arabic yāʼ

The letter  is named . It is written in several ways depending on its position in the word:

It is pronounced in four ways:
 As a consonant, it is pronounced as a palatal approximant , typically at the beginnings of words in front of short or long vowels.
A long   usually in the middle or end of words. In this case it has no diacritic, but could be marked with a kasra in the preceding letter in some traditions.
A long  In many dialects, as a result of the monophthongization that the diphthong  underwent in most words. 
 A part of a diphthong, . Then, it has no diacritic but could be marked with a sukun in some traditions. The preceding consonant could have no diacritic or have  sign, hinting to the first vowel in the diphthong, i.e. .

As a vowel, yāʾ can serve as the "seat" of the hamza: 

Yāʾ serves several functions in the Arabic language. Yāʾ as a prefix is the marker for a singular imperfective verb, as in   "he writes" from the root  K-T-B ("write, writing"). Yāʾ with a shadda is particularly used to turn a noun into an adjective, called a nisbah. For instance,   (Egypt) →  Miṣriyy (Egyptian). The transformation can be more abstract; for instance,  mawḍūʿ (matter, object) →  mawḍūʿiyy (objective). Still other uses of this function can be a bit further from the root:  ishtirāk (cooperation) →  ishtirākiyy (socialist).

A form similar to but distinguished from yāʾ is the  "limited/restricted alif", with the form . It indicates a final long  .

Alif maqṣūrah

Perso-Arabic ye

In the Persian alphabet, the letter is generally called ye following Persian-language custom. In its final form, the letter does not have dots, much like the Arabic  or, more to the point, much like the custom in Egypt, Sudan and sometimes Maghreb. On account of this difference, Perso-Arabic ye is located at a different Unicode code point than both of the standard Arabic letters. In computers, the Persian version of the letter automatically appears with two dots initially and medially:.

In Kashmiri, it uses a ring instead of dots below (ؠ).

Returned yāʾ 
In different calligraphic styles like the Hijazi script, Kufic, and Nastaʿlīq script, a final yāʾ might have a particular shape with the descender turned to the right, called  ("returned, recurred yāʾ"), either with two dots or without them.

In Urdu this is called baṛī ye ("big ye"), but is an independent letter used for /ɛː, eː/ and differs from the basic ye (choṭī ye, "little ye"). For this reason the letter has its own code point in Unicode. Nevertheless, its initial and medial forms are not different from the other ye (practically baṛī ye is not used in these positions).

Character encodings

References

External links

Phoenician alphabet
Hebrew letters
Vowel letters